The Ring Within is a Canadian documentary film, directed by Dan Bigras and released in 2002. The film centres on the then-emerging sport of mixed martial arts.

The film was a Genie Award nominee for Best Feature Length Documentary at the 23rd Genie Awards in 2003.

References

External links
 

2002 films
2002 documentary films
Canadian sports documentary films
Quebec films
Mixed martial arts documentaries
French-language Canadian films
2000s Canadian films